Smart Patrol Records is a do it yourself record company from Bodø, Norway. Established in 2001. Only releasing music from Norway, and Bodø in particular. Mostly vinyl, but from 2006 also CD-releases.

Discography
SPUD001 - The Union Policy - I.O.U. 7-inch EP
SPUD002 - The Spectacle - S/T 10-inch EP
SPUD003 - Magnus Eliassen - Lois Is Happy/Meat Is Murder 7-inch
SPUD004 - The Spectacle - Rope or Guillotine LP
SPUD005 - The Spectacle - Beats/Terms 7-inch
SPUD006 - The Spectacle - I, Fail 2×LP
SPUD007 - Beyond The Fences - No Ceiling In The Sky 10-inch EP
SPUD008 - Manna - Salma CD
SPUD009 - Tungtvann - Bodø City 7-inch
SPUD010 - Bodø Hardcore Festival - Dokumentar DVD
SPUD011 - Manna - Salma i dub LP
SPUD012 - Karlsøy Prestegaard - Dyret (666)/Barn av lyset CD
SPUD013 - Manna - Flamma CD
SPUD014 - Nagel - Frihelg CD

References

External links

Norwegian record labels